Amable Jodoin (May 31, 1828 – January 8, 1880) was a Canadian businessman and political figure in Quebec. He represented Chambly in the House of Commons of Canada from 1874 to 1875 as a Liberal member.

He was born in Boucherville, Lower Canada, the son of Amable Jodoin and Esther Weilbrenner. Jodoin served as a member of Montreal city council. He married Marie-Hélène Jodoin in 1853. Jodoin was a director of the Metropolitan Bank. In 1870, he purchased a foundry in Longueuil. The Jodoins also purchased several properties in the Old Montreal area. His election to the House of Commons in 1874 was overturned; he won the by-election which followed in 1875 but that election was again appealed; Pierre Basile Benoit won the by-election held in 1876. Jodoin died four years later at the age of 51 in Beloeil, Quebec.

References 

1828 births
1880 deaths
Members of the House of Commons of Canada from Quebec
Liberal Party of Canada MPs
People from Boucherville
People from Beloeil, Quebec